Erik "Cachete" Fernando Carrasco Follert (born May 18, 1983), is a Chilean professional basketball player.  He currently plays for the Club Deportivo Valdivia club of the Liga Nacional de Básquetbol de Chile, the country's top professional basketball league.

He represented Chile's national basketball team at the 2016 South American Basketball Championship in Caracas, Venezuela, where he recorded most assists and steals for Chile.

References

External links
 Real GM profile
 Latinbasket.com Profile

1983 births
Living people
Chilean men's basketball players
Guards (basketball)
Sportspeople from Santiago
Chile men's national basketball team players
20th-century Chilean people
21st-century Chilean people